Kennys Vargas Gautier (born August 1, 1990), nicknamed "Gorilla", is a Puerto Rican professional baseball designated hitter and first baseman in the Cincinnati Reds organization. He previously played in Major League Baseball (MLB) for the Minnesota Twins and for the Chiba Lotte Marines of Nippon Professional Baseball (NPB).

Vargas has been compared to David Ortiz due to their similarities in size.

Early life
Vargas was born in the municipality of  Canóvanas, already being larger than the average local population with a length of 22 and a half inches and a weight of ten pounds. He was raised by his mother, teacher Elsa Gautier, who was divorced by the time that he was three years old and was left in charge of all his sustenance. During his youth, the family lived near a baseball park, where he joined his brother Jeronys and learned the game by the time that he was four. After beginning in the district of Río Piedras, Vargas continued playing in his native Canóvanas. Due to his size, he also played basketball during his school years, but at the urging of his mother (who saw potential for him to go professional) he selected baseball. In the process, Vargas declined an invitation to a major high school basketball tournament in 10th grade. Now invested in developing as a baseball player, he requested a trip to watch the New York Yankees play for his 15th birthday. After going undrafted in the 2008 Major League Baseball draft, Vargas decided to enroll in an independent baseball academy in the Dominican Republic, where he spent the following months until the Minnesota Twins invited him to an evaluation. In February 2009, the organization signed him as an amateur free agent with a signing bonus that neared $100,000.

Career

Minnesota Twins
Vargas made his professional debut in 2009 with the Gulf Coast Twins. He also played for the Gulf Coast Twins in 2010. Vargas played the 2011 season with the Elizabethton Twins. He was hitting .322/.377/.489 with six home runs over 44 games, when he was suspended 50 games for a violation of the Minor League Drug Prevention and Treatment Program. After his suspension was over in 2012 he played for the Beloit Snappers. In 41 games he had 11 home runs and a 1.030 on-base plus slugging (OPS). Vargas played for the Fort Myers Miracle in 2013. In 125 games he hit 19 home runs. He was added to the Twins 40-man roster on November 20, 2013. Vargas started the 2014 season with the Double-A New Britain Rock Cats. In July he played in the All-Star Futures Game.

Vargas made his MLB debut on August 1, 2014, and hit his first career home run off Jesse Hahn five days later, on August 6, leading the Twins to a 3–1 victory over the Padres. Vargas wound up finishing the season as the Twins designated hitter, hitting 9 home runs with 38 rbi's in 53 games.

In the 2015 season, Vargas began the season as the Twins designated hitter although he was sent down a month later after a poor start. He was called up later in the season. Vargas finished his 2015 season with a .240 AVG in 58 games.

Vargas was named the American League's Player of the Week for the week of July 4 to July 10, 2016. After excelling at the AAA level, Vargas was given another shot for extended playing time for the Twins. He split time between designated hitter and first base. He finished with a .230 AVG in 47 games with 10 home runs.

In 2017, Vargas started the season in Triple A, but was once again called up at the end of April. In the offseason he trained alongside former major League players Carlos Delgado, José ‘Tony’ Valentín, and Manny Ramírez. He also played again with the Indios de Mayagüez in the Liga de Béisbol Profesional Roberto Clemente, Puerto Rico's baseball professional league.

On March 16, 2018, Vargas was designated for assignment by the Twins.

On March 22, Vargas was claimed off waivers by the Cincinnati Reds. On March 24, the Twins re-acquired Vargas by claiming him off waivers from the Reds, without Vargas appearing in an MLB game with the Reds. He was outrighted to Triple-A Rochester to start the 2018 season. Vargas elected free agency on November 2, 2018.

Chiba Lotte Marines
On November 6, 2018, Vargas signed with the Chiba Lotte Marines of Nippon Professional Baseball (NPB). Vargas hit .179/.324/.274 with 1 home run and 6 RBI for the Marines in 2019. On November 30, 2019, the Marines announced that the team would not sign Vargas for the 2020 season. Two days later, he became a free agent.

Detroit Tigers
On January 27, 2020, Vargas signed a minor-league contract with the Detroit Tigers. Vargas was released by the Tigers organization on July 7, 2020.

Saraperos de Saltillo
On March 6, 2021, Vargas signed with the Saraperos de Saltillo of the Mexican League. He was released on February 10, 2022.

Tecolotes de los Dos Laredos
On February 15, 2022, Vargas signed with the Tecolotes de los Dos Laredos of the Mexican League. Vargas appeared in 85 games for Dos Laredos in 2022, slashing .324/.462/.566 with 17 home runs and 65 RBI.

Cincinnati Reds
On February 2, 2023, Vargas signed a minor league contract with the Cincinnati Reds organization.

International career
Vargas played for the Puerto Rico national baseball team in the 2017 World Baseball Classic where he won a silver medal.

References

External links

1990 births
Living people
Beloit Snappers players
Chiba Lotte Marines players
Elizabethton Twins players
Fort Myers Miracle players
Gulf Coast Twins players
Indios de Mayagüez players
Major League Baseball first basemen
Major League Baseball players from Puerto Rico
Minnesota Twins players
New Britain Rock Cats players
Nippon Professional Baseball designated hitters
People from Canóvanas, Puerto Rico
Puerto Rican expatriate baseball players in Japan
Puerto Rican expatriate baseball players in Mexico
Rochester Red Wings players
Saraperos de Saltillo players
Tecolotes de los Dos Laredos players
2017 World Baseball Classic players